"Fly" is a song written and performed by Jars of Clay. It was the first mainstream single and second Christian radio single from their 2002 studio album, The Eleventh Hour.  A live version of the song appears on disc two of the band's 2003 double album, Furthermore: From the Studio, From the Stage.

Background
"Fly" is based on the story of a couple fighting a losing battle against the wife's cancer. Specifically, it is about the moment at which her husband "lets her go". The unnamed couple were friends or close acquaintances of band members.

Track listing
All versions of the song written by Charlie Lowell, Dan Haseltine, Matt Odmark, & Stephen Mason, unless otherwise noted

Mainstream radio single
"Fly" (Radio Version) - 3:12

Christian radio single
"Intro from Dan" - 0:60
"Fly" (AC Radio Remix) - 3:14
"More thoughts from Dan" - 0:24
"Thoughts from Steve" - 0:37
"Fly" (Album Version) - 3:18
"Closing remarks from Steve" - 0:16

Performance credits
Dan Haseltine - vocals
Charlie Lowell - keyboards, background vocals
Stephen Mason - guitar, background vocals
Matt Odmark - guitar, background vocals
Aaron Sands - bass
Joe Porter - drums

Charts
 No. 1 Christian CHR
 No. 3 Christian AC

Notes and references

Jars of Clay songs
2002 singles
Songs written by Dan Haseltine
Songs written by Charlie Lowell
Songs written by Stephen Mason (musician)
Songs written by Matt Odmark
2002 songs
Essential Records (Christian) singles